Maly Nagadak (Kese Nuğaźaq; , Kătaymas) is a rural locality (a village) in Tryapinsky Selsoviet, Aurgazinsky District, Bashkortostan, Russia. The population was 175 as of 2010. There are 4 streets.

Geography 
Maly Nagadak is located 29 km east of Tolbazy (the district's administrative centre) by road. Sofyino is the nearest rural locality.

References 

Rural localities in Aurgazinsky District